Wilāyat Wādī Banī Khālid is a Wilāyah (Province) in the Northern Governorate of the Eastern Region of Oman.

The wadi 
Wadi Bani Khalid is one of the best-known wadis in the Sultanate of Oman. Its stream maintains a constant flow of water throughout the year. Large pools of water and boulders are scattered along the course of the wadi. As a geographical area, the wadi covers a large swathe of lowland and the Hajar Mountains.

Kuhūf form some of the features of this wadi. These include Kahf Maqal, which was described as an "underground chamber" of the Sultanate of Oman, or the akthar ('best') out of 4,000 caves. Aflāj (underground canals) or ʿUyūn are also common in this wadi, including ʿAin Ḥamūdah, ʿAin aṣ-Ṣārūj and ʿAin Dawwah.

Villages or towns 
The village of Badaʿ is a well-known stop for tourists in the valley.

History
The earliest inhabitants of the Wadi Bani Khalid area were the Bedouin tribes, whose traditional lifestyle was different from that of nomadic life. 

From then on, the wadi has since been a tourist attraction, for its beautiful desert scenery and deep turquoise natural springs.

See also 
 Eastern Arabia
 List of wadis of Oman
 Wadi Bani Awf

Notes

References

External links 
 
 Wadi Bani Khalid - Oman Tours (HD)
 Beautiful river in Oman, Wadi Bani Khalid
 وادي بني خالد . مغارة مقل . خفافيش (in Arabic)
 نظرة على مغارة "مقل "بولاية وادي بني خالد في محافظة شمال الشرقية
 كهف مقل ولاية وادي بني خالد / MUQAL CAVE - oman (partly in Arabic)

Rivers of Oman
Bani Khalid
Ash Sharqiyah North Governorate